Windy Harbour is a holiday settlement surrounded by D’Entrecasteaux National Park. It is located 27 km south of Northcliffe, on the south coast of Western Australia east of Augusta and west of Nornalup.  It lies just east of Point D'Entrecasteaux.

Fishing, snorkelling and whale watching are the major attractions of Windy Harbour.

Coastal zone
The area of Windy Harbour coastal zone was studied before it became part of the national park.

Settlement
The history of the settlement is tied in with the forestry communities inland from the harbour and the rock lobster fishing industry.

The area was also the location of coastal fishing huts, which have been at times removed due to their not being approved by local authorities.

See also
 Sandy Island (Windy Harbour)
 Quagering Island
 Mount Chudalup
 The Cow and The Calf

References

South coast of Western Australia